{{DISPLAYTITLE:D4 polytope}}
In 4-dimensional geometry, there are 7 uniform 4-polytopes with reflections of D4 symmetry, all are shared with higher symmetry constructions in the B4 or F4 symmetry families. there is also one half symmetry alternation, the snub 24-cell.

Visualizations
Each can be visualized as symmetric orthographic projections in Coxeter planes of the D4 Coxeter group, and other subgroups. The B4 coxeter planes are also displayed, while D4 polytopes only have half the symmetry. They can also be shown in perspective projections of Schlegel diagrams, centered on different cells.

Coordinates 

The base point can generate the coordinates of the polytope by taking all coordinate permutations and sign combinations. The edges' length will be . Some polytopes have two possible generator points. Points are prefixed by Even to imply only an even count of sign permutations should be included.

References

 J.H. Conway and M.J.T. Guy: Four-Dimensional Archimedean Polytopes, Proceedings of the Colloquium on Convexity at Copenhagen, page 38 und 39, 1965 
 John H. Conway, Heidi Burgiel, Chaim Goodman-Strauss, The Symmetries of Things 2008,  (Chapter 26)
 H.S.M. Coxeter:
 H.S.M. Coxeter, Regular Polytopes, 3rd Edition, Dover New York, 1973
 Kaleidoscopes: Selected Writings of H.S.M. Coxeter, edited by F. Arthur Sherk, Peter McMullen, Anthony C. Thompson, Asia Ivic Weiss, Wiley-Interscience Publication, 1995,  Wiley::Kaleidoscopes: Selected Writings of H.S.M. Coxeter
 (Paper 22) H.S.M. Coxeter, Regular and Semi Regular Polytopes I, [Math. Zeit. 46 (1940) 380-407, MR 2,10]
 (Paper 23) H.S.M. Coxeter, Regular and Semi-Regular Polytopes II, [Math. Zeit. 188 (1985) 559-591]
 (Paper 24) H.S.M. Coxeter, Regular and Semi-Regular Polytopes III, [Math. Zeit. 200 (1988) 3-45]
 N.W. Johnson: The Theory of Uniform Polytopes and Honeycombs, Ph.D. Dissertation, University of Toronto, 1966

External links
 
 Uniform, convex polytopes in four dimensions:, Marco Möller  
 

 

4-polytopes